Ishidagawa Dam is a rockfill dam located in Shiga prefecture in Japan. The dam is used for flood control. The catchment area of the dam is 23.4 km2. The dam impounds about 16  ha of land when full and can store 2710 thousand cubic meters of water. The construction of the dam was started on 1962 and completed in 1969.

References

Dams in Shiga Prefecture
1969 establishments in Japan